Andrew Sarauer (born November 17, 1984) Canadian-Hungarian professional ice hockey left winger currently playing for Fehérvár AV19 of the ICE Hockey League (ICEHL). He has previously played in the American Hockey League (AHL) for the Lake Erie Monsters, Norfolk Admirals, Rockford IceHogs and Hershey Bears, as well as the ECHL for the Johnstown Chiefs, Reading Royals and Las Vegas Wranglers.

Playing career
He was selected 125th overall in the 2004 NHL Entry Draft by the Vancouver Canucks after having played two seasons of Junior A in the British Columbia Hockey League (BCHL). Prior to turning professional, he played four years of college hockey with Northern Michigan University.

On June 22, 2011, Sarauer signed his first European contract with Danish team, Frederikshavn White Hawks of the AL-Bank Ligaen, on a one-year deal. Sarauer scored at a point per game pace for the White Hawks before returning to North American at season's end, signing a one-year deal with the Las Vegas Wranglers of the ECHL on September 12, 2012.

In the 2012–13 season for the Wranglers, Sarauer continued his offensive prowess in the ECHL, scoring 21 goals and 62 points on the top line in 70 games. On May 30, 2013, Sarauer opted for another contract abroad agreeing to a one-year contract with Hungarian club, SAPA Fehérvár AV19 of the EBEL.

Sarauer spent four seasons with Volan, gaining Hungarian citizenship and used as a focal point offensively. As a free agent following the 2016–17 season, Sarauer opted to move to Austrian outfit, EC VSV, on a one-year deal on May 11, 2017. Following the conclusion of his contract with Villach, Sarauer returned to Alba Volán Székesfehérvár.

Career statistics

Regular season and playoffs

International

References

External links

1984 births
Fehérvár AV19 players
Canadian ice hockey left wingers
Hungarian ice hockey players
Frederikshavn White Hawks players
Hershey Bears players
Johnstown Chiefs players
Lake Erie Monsters players
Las Vegas Wranglers players
Living people
Norfolk Admirals players
Northern Michigan Wildcats men's ice hockey players
Reading Royals players
Rockford IceHogs (AHL) players
Ice hockey people from Saskatchewan
Vancouver Canucks draft picks
EC VSV players
Canadian expatriate ice hockey players in Hungary